John Shivers may refer to:
 John Shivers (Medal of Honor) (1830–?), U.S. Marine and Medal of Honor recipient
 John Shivers (sound designer), American theatrical sound designer
 John D. Shivers Jr., member of the Ohio House of Representatives